Morgan D. Lane (1844 – July 19, 1892) was a Chief Bugler in the Union Army and a Medal of Honor recipient for his role in the American Civil War.

Medal of Honor citation
Rank and organization: Private, Signal Corps, U.S. Army. Place and date: Near Jetersville, Va., April 6, 1865. Entered service at: Allegany Mich. Birth: Monroe, N.Y. Date of issue: March 16, 1866.

Citation:

Capture of flag of gunboat Nansemond.

See also
List of American Civil War Medal of Honor recipients: G–L

References

External links
US Army Signal Corps Website

1844 births
1892 deaths
United States Army Medal of Honor recipients
Union Army soldiers
People from Monroe, New York
People of New York (state) in the American Civil War
American Civil War recipients of the Medal of Honor